The 1979 Tampa Bay Rowdies indoor season was the fifth indoor season of the club's existence.

Overview
Much to the dismay of Rowdies owner, George Strawbridge, the North American Soccer League owners voted to hold off on a full indoor season for 1978–79 after previously approving it. And just as in the winters of 1977 and 1978, when indoor seasons had been nixed, the NASL did not restrict teams from scheduling indoor matches on their own. The end result of this was that the Major Indoor Soccer League was able to launch its inaugural season from December 1978 though March 1978 with virtually no competition from the NASL.

For their part, Tampa Bay played five indoor games in the Winter of 1979, the last four of which were played at the Bayfront Center. The Rowdies first match, on January 25 against the Houston Hurricane, took on a different complexion than the ones that it preceded, and not just because it was an away game. The Hurricane spent their winters playing indoors in the MISL, as the Houston Summit. Although the Summit were in midseason, the two leagues didn’t officially sanction interleague play, so when facing the Rowdies Houston played under their “Hurricane” moniker. Despite that fact, they wore their Summit uniforms, and the match featured MISL timing (four 15-minute quarters), MISL goal dimensions (6.5’ high x 12’ wide), even a bright orange MISL ball. Ironically, the NASL would wind up adopting the MISL's timing and goal size when they finally began their first full indoor season 10 months later in November 1979.

Tampa Bay's next two matches were part of a two-day, four-team mini-tournament called the 1979 NASL Budweiser Indoor Soccer Invitational. The Rowdies won both of their matches, but lost the title on goal differential to the Dallas Tornado, who had also won both of theirs. The second of those invitational matches saw Tampa Bay goalie, Winston DuBose, become only the second goalkeeper in the NASL’s brief indoor history to record a shutout.

The Rowdies game on February 2 versus the Houston Hurricane (this time played  with NASL goals and timing) marked the first time they had ever lost an indoor match at home to a domestic opponent. Tampa Bay's final match of the indoor campaign was an international friendly against FC Dynamo Moscow on February 19. The lopsided, 8–1, loss closed their indoor season record at 3–2. Over 24,700 fans watched the Rowdies at home in 1979, with all but about 650 total tickets being sold for the four matches.

Club

Roster 

*trialist players

Management and technical staff 
 George W. Strawbridge, Jr., owner
 Chas Serednesky, Jr., general manager 
 Gordon Jago, head coach 
 Ken Shields, trainer
 Alfredo Beronda, equipment manager

Honors 
 Budweiser Indoor Soccer Invitational: runners-up

Competitions

Invitational final standings
GF = Goals For, GA = Goals Against, GD = Goal Differential

*Dallas wins Invitational on goal differential

Results summaries

Match reports

Statistics

Scoring
G = Goals (worth 2 points), A = Assists (worth 1 point), Pts = Points

Goalkeeping
Note: GP = Games played; Min = Minutes played; GA = Goals against; GAA = Goals against average; W = Wins; L = Losses

Player movement

See also 

 1979 team indoor stats

References 

1979 indoor
Tampa Bay Rowdies (1975–1993) seasons
Tampa Bay Rowdies
Tampa Bay Rowdies
Tampa Bay Rowdies
Tampa Bay Rowdies
Sports in St. Petersburg, Florida